Jam Vhille Fernando Sebastian (20 March 1986 – 4 March 2015), better known as Jam Sebastian, was a Filipino actor and an internet personality. He is known for being in a love team with Michelle Liggayu, who was his fiancee in real life with the two collectively known as JaMich. He received significant reception in the Philippines as a YouTuber.

Biography
Jam Sebastian was born at 7:37 PM on Thursday, 20 March 1986 at the Chinese General Hospital and Medical Center and was the second son of Vilmo Flores Sebastian (born 28 August 1961, Santa Cruz, Manila) and Maria Carmen "Maricar" G. Fernando. His older brother Yexel is a toy collector who owns three toy museums in the Philippines.

JaMich
Before JaMich, Sebastian had described his relationship with Paolinne Michelle Liggayu as puppy love. Sebastian had also confirmed during an interview with StarStudio Magazine that they aka "JaMich" have been a couple since 2008.

JaMich became one of YouTube's popular love teams in 2011. By Chance was their first uploaded video which gained more than seven million views with 543,163 accumulated subscribers. The duo joined Twitter in June 2011 and has since acquired over a million followers. After six years, the official engagement of JaMich was announced. It was Liggayu who proposed to Sebastian at the Philippine International Convention Center on 11 May 2014.

Illness and death
In January 2014, Sebastian was diagnosed with stage 4 lung cancer. Jam Sebastian died on 4 March 2015, sixteen days before his 29th birthday. Jam was buried at the Manila Memorial Park – Sucat Parañaque.

Filmography

Short-films

Music videos

References

1986 births
2015 deaths
Deaths from lung cancer in the Philippines
People from Las Piñas
People from Santa Cruz, Manila
Filipino YouTubers
Burials at the Manila Memorial Park – Sucat
YouTube channels launched in 2011
YouTube channels closed in 2014